The 43rd Gawad Urian Awards (Tagalog: Ika-4 na Gawad Urian) was held on November 10, 2020. The best Philippine films for the year 2019 were honored in the event. Nominations were announced on August 27. 

Babae at Baril received the most nominations with nine. It won six awards, including Best Picture. 

The Natatanging Gawad Urian was awarded to Fiel Corrales Zabat.

Winners and nominees

Special Award

Natatanging Gawad Urian 

 Fiel Corrales Zabat

Multiple nominations and awards

References

Gawad Urian Awards
2019 film awards
2020 in Philippine cinema